St Patrick's Channel may refer to:
 North Channel (Great Britain and Ireland), formerly also called St Patrick's Channel
 St. Patricks Channel an arm of Bras d'Or Lake, Cape Breton Island, Canada